Calcineurin-binding protein cabin-1 is a protein that in humans is encoded by the CABIN1 gene.

Function 

Calcineurin plays an important role in the T-cell receptor-mediated signal transduction pathway. The protein encoded by this gene binds specifically to the activated form of calcineurin and inhibits calcineurin-mediated signal transduction. The encoded protein is found in the nucleus and contains a leucine zipper domain as well as several PEST motifs, sequences which confer targeted degradation to those proteins which contain them. At least four alternatively spliced transcripts have been found for this gene, but the full-length nature of most of them has not been determined.

Interactions 

CABIN1 has been shown to interact with:
 Amphiphysin, 
 MEF2B, 
 MEF2D,  and
 SIN3A.

References

Further reading

External links